The following is a list of notable events and releases of the year 1930 in Norwegian music.

Events

Deaths

 January
 1 – Peter Brynie Lindeman, organist, cellist, and composer (born 1858).

 June
 16 – Hannah Løvenskiold, composer (born 1860).

 December
 1 – Michael Flagstad, violinist and conductor (born 1869).
 29 – Oscar Borg, composer and conductor (born 1851).

Births

 January
 9 – Tone Groven Holmboe, composer and music teacher.

 April
 14 – Ola Calmeyer, jazz pianist (died 2003).
 23 – Mikkel Flagstad, jazz saxophonist (died 2005).

 May
 6 – Kjell Bækkelund, classical pianist (died 2004).
 11 – Elisabeth Granneman, singer, songwriter, children's writer and actress (died 1992).

 July
 27 – Einar Iversen, jazz pianist and composer.

 September
 27 – Gerhard Aspheim, jazz trombonist (died 2009).

 December
 20 – Jan Elgarøy, organist and composer.

See also
 1930 in Norway
 Music of Norway

References

 
Norwegian music
Norwegian
Music
1930s in Norwegian music